Love's Alright is the third musical studio album by comedian and singer Eddie Murphy. The album was released on February 23, 1993 by Motown Records, and was produced by Murphy, David Allen Jones and Ralph Hawkins. It was a critical and commercial failure, only making it to number 80 on the Top R&B/Hip-Hop Albums chart. Two singles were released: "Whatzupwitu", whose music video is patterned after the album cover and features Michael Jackson, and "I Was a King", featuring Shabba Ranks. The album did not chart well on the Billboard charts.

Track listing

 "Yeah" contains special guest vocals by Aaron Hall, Amy Grant, Babyface, Barry White, Bon Jovi, Elton John, Emmanuel Lewis, En Vogue, Garth Brooks, Heavy D, Howard Hewett, Janet Jackson, Johnny Gill, Julio Iglesias, Luther Vandross, MC Hammer, Michael Jackson, Patti LaBelle, Paul McCartney, Richie Sambora, Stevie Wonder and Teddy Pendergrass. It also contains bass performed by Stanley Clarke, harmonica performed by Stevie Wonder and piano performed by Herbie Hancock.

References

1993 albums
Eddie Murphy albums
Motown albums
Soul albums by American artists